This article lists the United Arab Emirates national football team all-time head-to-head record with other official FIFA members and records in competitive tournaments.

Head-to-head record

AFC
Last updated at 13 January 2023

CAF
Last updated at 29 May 2022

CONCACAF
Last updated at 30 August 2019

CONMEBOL
Last updated at 16 November 2022

OFC
Last updated at 9 September 2013

UEFA
Last updated at 19 November 2022

Home matches
As of 30 December 2022

UAE in Competitive Tournaments

FIFA World Cup record

Matches

AFC Asian Cup record

Matches

FIFA Confederations Cup record

Arabian Gulf Cup record

References

External links

record